Dunchon Oryun is a railway station on Seoul Subway Line 9. It was opened on December 1, 2018.

References

Seoul Metropolitan Subway stations
Metro stations in Songpa District
Metro stations in Gangdong District
Railway stations opened in 2018